Physcaeneura robertsi is a butterfly in the family Nymphalidae. It is found in central Tanzania.

The length of the forewings is 17-17.3 mm for males and 19-19.6 mm for females. The forewing ground colour is whitish with a narrowly brown costa, slightly widening towards the apex. The apex and outer margin are brown, enclosing four orange, black-centered round spots. There are two submarginal dark-brown lines and a fine dark-brown border. The hindwings are whitish with a brown outer border.

References

Endemic fauna of Tanzania
Satyrini
Butterflies described in 1990